The 2003–04 NBL season was the 26th season of competition since its establishment in 1979. A total of 12 teams contested the league. This season marked the first NBL season that featured the New Zealand Breakers, the first New Zealand team in the Australian competition. Also, the Canberra Cannons were replaced by the Hunter Pirates.

Regular season
The 2003–04 regular season took place over 22 rounds between 1 October 2003 and 29 February 2004.

Round 1

|- bgcolor="#CCCCFF" font size=1
!width=90| Date
!width=180| Home
!width=60| Score
!width=180| Away
!width=260| Venue
!width=70| Crowd
!width=70| Boxscore

Round 2

|- bgcolor="#CCCCFF" font size=1
!width=90| Date
!width=180| Home
!width=60| Score
!width=180| Away
!width=260| Venue
!width=70| Crowd
!width=70| Boxscore

Round 3

|- bgcolor="#CCCCFF" font size=1
!width=90| Date
!width=180| Home
!width=60| Score
!width=180| Away
!width=260| Venue
!width=70| Crowd
!width=70| Boxscore

Round 4

|- bgcolor="#CCCCFF" font size=1
!width=90| Date
!width=180| Home
!width=60| Score
!width=180| Away
!width=260| Venue
!width=70| Crowd
!width=70| Boxscore

Round 5

|- bgcolor="#CCCCFF" font size=1
!width=90| Date
!width=180| Home
!width=60| Score
!width=180| Away
!width=260| Venue
!width=70| Crowd
!width=70| Boxscore

Round 6

|- bgcolor="#CCCCFF" font size=1
!width=90| Date
!width=180| Home
!width=60| Score
!width=180| Away
!width=260| Venue
!width=70| Crowd
!width=70| Boxscore

Round 7

|- bgcolor="#CCCCFF" font size=1
!width=90| Date
!width=180| Home
!width=60| Score
!width=180| Away
!width=260| Venue
!width=70| Crowd
!width=70| Boxscore

Round 8

|- bgcolor="#CCCCFF" font size=1
!width=90| Date
!width=180| Home
!width=60| Score
!width=180| Away
!width=260| Venue
!width=70| Crowd
!width=70| Boxscore

Round 9

|- bgcolor="#CCCCFF" font size=1
!width=90| Date
!width=180| Home
!width=60| Score
!width=180| Away
!width=260| Venue
!width=70| Crowd
!width=70| Boxscore

Round 10

|- bgcolor="#CCCCFF" font size=1
!width=90| Date
!width=180| Home
!width=60| Score
!width=180| Away
!width=260| Venue
!width=70| Crowd
!width=70| Boxscore

Round 11

|- bgcolor="#CCCCFF" font size=1
!width=90| Date
!width=180| Home
!width=60| Score
!width=180| Away
!width=260| Venue
!width=70| Crowd
!width=70| Boxscore

Round 12

|- bgcolor="#CCCCFF" font size=1
!width=90| Date
!width=180| Home
!width=60| Score
!width=180| Away
!width=260| Venue
!width=70| Crowd
!width=70| Boxscore

Round 13

|- bgcolor="#CCCCFF" font size=1
!width=90| Date
!width=180| Home
!width=60| Score
!width=180| Away
!width=260| Venue
!width=70| Crowd
!width=70| Boxscore

Round 14

|- bgcolor="#CCCCFF" font size=1
!width=90| Date
!width=180| Home
!width=60| Score
!width=180| Away
!width=260| Venue
!width=70| Crowd
!width=70| Boxscore

Round 15

|- bgcolor="#CCCCFF" font size=1
!width=90| Date
!width=180| Home
!width=60| Score
!width=180| Away
!width=260| Venue
!width=70| Crowd
!width=70| Boxscore

Round 16

|- bgcolor="#CCCCFF" font size=1
!width=90| Date
!width=180| Home
!width=60| Score
!width=180| Away
!width=260| Venue
!width=70| Crowd
!width=70| Boxscore

Round 17

|- bgcolor="#CCCCFF" font size=1
!width=90| Date
!width=180| Home
!width=60| Score
!width=180| Away
!width=260| Venue
!width=70| Crowd
!width=70| Boxscore

Round 18

|- bgcolor="#CCCCFF" font size=1
!width=90| Date
!width=180| Home
!width=60| Score
!width=180| Away
!width=260| Venue
!width=70| Crowd
!width=70| Boxscore

Round 19

|- bgcolor="#CCCCFF" font size=1
!width=90| Date
!width=180| Home
!width=60| Score
!width=180| Away
!width=260| Venue
!width=70| Crowd
!width=70| Boxscore

Round 20

|- bgcolor="#CCCCFF" font size=1
!width=90| Date
!width=180| Home
!width=60| Score
!width=180| Away
!width=260| Venue
!width=70| Crowd
!width=70| Boxscore

Round 21

|- bgcolor="#CCCCFF" font size=1
!width=90| Date
!width=180| Home
!width=60| Score
!width=180| Away
!width=260| Venue
!width=70| Crowd
!width=70| Boxscore

Round 22

|- bgcolor="#CCCCFF" font size=1
!width=90| Date
!width=180| Home
!width=60| Score
!width=180| Away
!width=260| Venue
!width=70| Crowd
!width=70| Boxscore

Ladder

The NBL tie-breaker system as outlined in the NBL Rules and Regulations states that in the case of an identical win–loss record, the results in games played between the teams will determine order of seeding.

1West Sydney Razorbacks won Head-to-Head (2-1).

Finals

Playoff bracket

Elimination Finals

|- bgcolor="#CCCCFF" font size=1
!width=90| Date
!width=180| Home
!width=60| Score
!width=180| Away
!width=260| Venue
!width=70| Crowd
!width=70| Boxscore

Semi-finals

|- bgcolor="#CCCCFF" font size=1
!width=90| Date
!width=180| Home
!width=60| Score
!width=180| Away
!width=260| Venue
!width=70| Crowd
!width=70| Boxscore

Grand Final

|- bgcolor="#CCCCFF" font size=1
!width=90| Date
!width=180| Home
!width=60| Score
!width=180| Away
!width=260| Venue
!width=70| Crowd
!width=70| Boxscore

All Star Game

Most Valuable Player 

Ebi Ere (Sydney Kings)

Awards
 NBL Most Valuable Player: Matthew Nielsen (Sydney Kings)
 Larry Sengstock Medal (GF MVP): Matthew Nielsen (Sydney Kings)
 NBL Coach of the Year: Joey Wright (Brisbane Bullets)
 NBL Best Defensive Player: Ben Castle (Brisbane Bullets)
 NBL Rookie of the Year: Steven Markovic (West Sydney Razorbacks)
 NBL Most Improved Player: Geordie Cullen (Hunter Pirates)
 NBL Best Sixth Man: Darryl McDonald (Melbourne Tigers)
 All-NBL First Team:
 Matthew Nielsen (Sydney Kings)
 Mark Bradtke (Melbourne Tigers)
 Stephen Black (Brisbane Bullets)
 John Rillie (West Sydney Razorbacks)
 Sam Mackinnon (West Sydney Razorbacks)

Player of the month
 October: Matthew Nielsen (Sydney Kings)
 November: Dusty Rychart (Adelaide 36ers)
 December: Kevin Freeman (Brisbane Bullets)
 January: Mike Chappell (New Zealand Breakers)
 February: Matthew Nielsen  (Sydney Kings)

Coach of the month
 October: Brian Goorjian (Sydney Kings)
 November: Brendan Joyce (Wollongong Hawks)
 December: Joey Wright (Brisbane Bullets)
 January: Gordon McLeod (West Sydney Razorbacks)
 February: Brendan Joyce (Wollongong Hawks)

All NBL Team

References

 
Australia,NBL
2003–04 in Australian basketball
2003 in New Zealand basketball
2004 in New Zealand basketball